Proving a negative or negative proof may refer to:

Proving a negative, in the philosophic burden of proof
Evidence of absence in general, such as evidence that there is no milk in a certain bowl
Modus tollens, a logical proof
Proof of impossibility, mathematics
 Russell's teapot, an analogy: inability to disprove does not prove
Sometimes it is mistaken for an argument from ignorance, which is non-proof and a logical fallacy